Annibale is the Italian masculine given name and surname equivalent to Hannibal.

In English, it may refer to :

Given name
 Annibale Albani (1682–1751), Italian cardinal
 Annibale I Bentivoglio, (died 1445), ruler of Bologna from 1443
 Annibale II Bentivoglio (died 1540), lord of Bologna in 1511–1512
 Annibale Bergonzoli (1884–1973), Italian lieutenant general
 Annibale Bugnini (c.1912–1982), Roman Catholic prelate
 Annibale Caccavello (1515–1595),  Italian sculptor
 Annibale Caro (1507–1566), Italian poet
 Annibale Carracci (1560–1609), Italian painter 
 Annibale Ciarniello (1900–2007), one of the last surviving Italian veterans of the First World War
 Annibale de Gasparis (1819–1892), Italian astronomer
 Annibale della Genga (1760–1829), birth name of Pope Leo XII
 Annibale di Ceccano (c.1282–1350), Italian cardinal
 Annibale Fontana (1540–1587), Italian sculptor, medalist and crystal worker
 Annibale Maria di Francia (1851–1927), founder of the Congregation of the Rogationists and of the Daughters of Divine Zeal
 Annibale Frossi (1911–1999), footballer
 Annibale Gonzaga (1602–1668), Holy Roman Empire field marshal
 Annibale Maggi, Italian architect also known as Annibale Bassano or da Bassano
 Annibale Padovano (1527–1575), Italian composer and organist 
 Annibale Riccò (1844–1919), Italian astronomer
 Annibale Santorre di Rossi de Pomarolo, Count of Santarosa (1783–1825), Italian insurgent and leader in the revival (Risorgimento) of Italy
 Annibale Stabile (c.1535–1595), Italian composer of the Renaissance
 Annibale Zoilo (c.1537–1592), Italian composer and singer

Surname
Antonio Annibale (born 1940), Italian retired footballer
Giuseppe d' Annibale (1815–1892), cardinal and theologian

Other

Annibale (film), a 1959 Italian film

See also
Annibal (disambiguation)
Aníbal (name), the Spanish version of the name
Hannibal (disambiguation)

Italian masculine given names

de:Hannibal (1959)
fr:Annibal (film)
pt:Annibale